This is a list of think tanks in Wales.

A–I 

 The Bevan Foundation
 Centre for Welsh Studies
 Gorwel
 Institute of Welsh Affairs

J–Z 

 Morgan Academy, Swansea University
 Nova Cambria
 Public Policy Institute for Wales (former)
 Wales Governance Centre
 WISERD - Wales Institute of Social and Economic Research, Data and Methods
 Welsh Centre for International Affairs
 Wales Centre for Public Policy

See also 

 List of political movements in Wales
 List of think tanks in the United Kingdom
 Advocacy groups
 List of think tanks
 Politics of Wales

References

External links 

 Thinktanks — Special Report, Politics, Guardian Unlimited
 Think Tanks in Wales - Ideas and impact: understanding Welsh think tanks, Bevan Foundation
 Government and Politics in Wales  Internet Sources on Government and Politics in Wales, Keele University

Think tanks
 Think tanks based in Wales
Think tanks in Wales
Wales